The Little Punker is a 1992 German animated feature independent dramedy film by director Michael Schaack.

Voice cast
Rainer Strecker ...  Amadeus
Ilona Schulz ...  Pinke
Reinhard Krökel ...  Hübi
Gerlach Fiedler ...  Schulzeee
Thomas Struck ...  Schulzes Boss
Ernie Reinhardt ...  Oma Neumann
Michael Kleiber ...  Der 'wahre Udo', Schwarzwald-Oma, und Kontrolletti
Dieter Landuris ...  Raffke u.a.
Claus-Peter Damitz ...  Bogie u.a.
Ruth Rockenschaub ...  Kontrolletta u.a.
Gerhard Garbers ...  Postbote u.a.
Jürgen Wohlrabe ...  Vorsitzender
Susanne Stangl ...  Passantin
Fuat Saka ...  Dicker Müllmann
Ünal Gümüs ...  Dünner Müllmann

External links

German animated films
1992 animated films
Films set in Berlin
1992 films
German independent films
1992 independent films
1990s German-language films
Films directed by Michael Schaack
1990s German films